Hugo Rolando Corbalán (born 8 November 1970 in San Miguel de Tucumán) is a retired Argentine football defender who played 165 league games for Huracán in the Primera División Argentina.

Corbalán started his playing career in 1989 playing in the Argentine 2nd division with local club Atlético Tucumán. In 1991, he signed with Huracán where he went on to become a regular feature of the Racing team.

In 1998 Corbalán joined Racing Club de Avellaneda but he only made one league appearance for the club before returning to the lower divisions of Argentine football.

In 1999, he joined Independiente Rivadavia of the Argentine 2nd division, he then played for two of his home town clubs San Martín de Tucumán and then a second stint with Atlético Tucumán. His final club was Sportivo Villa Dolores of Catamarca in 2004.

External links
 BDFA profile
 Argentine Primera statistics

1970 births
Living people
Sportspeople from San Miguel de Tucumán
Argentine footballers
Association football defenders
Atlético Tucumán footballers
Club Atlético Huracán footballers
Racing Club de Avellaneda footballers
Independiente Rivadavia footballers
San Martín de Tucumán footballers